The Kilmore Sandstone Group is a geologic group in Ireland. It preserves fossils dating back to the Devonian period.

See also

 List of fossiliferous stratigraphic units in Ireland

References

Geologic groups of Europe
Geologic formations of Ireland
Devonian System of Europe
Devonian Ireland
Sandstone formations